Haoliang Xu is a UN Assistant Secretary-General and UNDP Director of Bureau for Policy and Programme Support in New York. The announcement of his appointment from 3 July 2019 said, "Mr. Xu places strong emphasis on a clear strategic vision, a culture of collaboration and a mindset of continuous innovation, working with colleagues to deliver impactful development solutions."

Previously, Mr. Xu served as UN Assistant Secretary-General and UNDP Director of the Regional Bureau for Asia and Pacific. Appointed on 13 August 2013, Mr. Xu led UNDP support to country and regional sustainable development programmes in 36 countries in Asia and Pacific. His tenure has been focused on reinventing UNDP's 24 Country Offices in Asia-Pacific, the Regional Hub in Bangkok and Headquarters in New York.

Previously, Xu was Deputy Director of the Regional Bureau for Europe and the Commonwealth of Independent States at UNDP. Prior to that, he held senior UNDP positions in Kazakhstan, Pakistan, Timor-Leste and Iran. Before joining the UN, Xu was a computer-aided design engineer with Louis Berger Group in Morristown, New Jersey, United States, and an assistant lecturer at Tongji University in Shanghai, China.

Xu, a Chinese national, holds a Bachelors in Engineering from Tongji University, and a Masters’ of Science in Management from the Stevens Institute of Technology, United States. He also holds a Masters’ of International Affairs in Economic Development and Policy Analysis from Columbia University.

Xu has appeared on the Washington Post, BBC World TV, CNBC, the Wall Street Journal and other top tier media. He delivered policy speeches at Harvard, Georgetown, Johns Hopkins, Columbia and other universities. He was featured by the EY and The Guardian in the 2014 Global Public Leaders Series.

References

Haoliang Xu: How Aid Now Works and Why It Still Matters

Haoliang Xu: "The Changing Role of UNDP in Asia-Pacific"

Haoliang Xu and Ramya Gopalan: Fighting the innovation antibodies: Three years of exploration at UNDP Asia-Pacific

Devex interview with Haoliang Xu: fielding 'complex asks' from cities on environment, policy director says

Living people
Chinese officials of the United Nations
Year of birth missing (living people)
School of International and Public Affairs, Columbia University alumni